Hydriotaphia, Urn Burial, or, a Discourse of the Sepulchral Urns lately found in Norfolk is a work by Sir Thomas Browne, published in 1658 as the first part of a two-part work that concludes with The Garden of Cyrus.

The title is Greek for "urn burial": A hydria (ὑδρία) is a large Greek pot, and taphos (τάφος) means "tomb".

Its nominal subject was the discovery of some 40 to 50 Anglo-Saxon pots in Norfolk. The discovery of these remains prompts Browne to deliver, first, a description of the antiquities found, and then a survey of most of the burial and funerary customs, ancient and current, of which his era was aware.

The most famous part of the work is the apotheosis of the fifth chapter, where Browne declaims:

Influence
Urn Burial has been admired by Charles Lamb, Samuel Johnson, John Cowper Powys, James Joyce, Jorge Luis Borges, Derek Walcott, Herman Melville and George Saintsbury, who called it "the longest piece, perhaps, of absolutely sublime rhetoric to be found in the prose literature of the world", while Ralph Waldo Emerson said that it "smells in every word of the sepulchre". Browne's text is discussed in W. G. Sebald's novel The Rings of Saturn. It is also cited by Penelope Lively to furnish the title of her novel Treasures of Time and in the text (Ch 3). The English composer William Alwyn wrote his Symphony No. 5, subtitled Hydriotaphia, in homage to Browne's imagery and rhythmic prose. The America composer Douglas J. Cuomo's The Fate of His Ashes: Requiem for Victims of Power for chorus and organ takes its text from Urn Burial. Derek Walcott uses an excerpt as the epigraph to his poem "Ruins of a Great House," while Edgar Allan Poe quotes the Urn Burial at the beginning of "The Murders in the Rue Morgue". Alain de Botton references the work in his book Status Anxiety. Borges refers to it in the final line of his short story "Tlön, Uqbar, Orbis Tertius". It also appears in the novel Sanshirō, written by Natsume Sōseki; Hirota-sensei lent the book to Sanshirō.

References

External links
 Sir Thomas Browne's works, volume 3 (1835), edited by Simon Wilkin: Hydriotaphia
 Text of Hydriotaphia, Urn Burial and The Garden of Cyrus
 Recordings of Hydriotaphia and Religio Medici at Librivox (public domain audiobooks)

1658 books
Archaeology books
Philosophy books
Death customs
Works by Thomas Browne